was a Japanese woodblock printer, considered by many to be the last master in the art of kabuki yakusha-e "actor pictures".

Biography
He was born Natori Yoshinosuke, the fifth son of a silk merchant, in Yamanashi Prefecture. His family settled in Tokyo shortly after his birth, where he remained until his death in 1960.

He subsequently studied at the Tokyo School of Fine Arts.
 
Natori Shunsen developed an interest in kabuki actor portraits while working as an illustrator for the newspaper Asahi Shimbun. During this time, he had the opportunity to meet the publisher Watanabe Shōzaburō, who was the primary force behind the shin-hanga movement.

In 1925, Natori and Watanabe worked together on a series of 36 actor portraits. This series contains some of Natori's finest kabuki designs. Watanabe lavishly produced each print in a limited edition of 150 and sold them only by subscription. The series lasted through 1929, followed by a supplemental series of 15 actor prints produced through 1931.

Natori's actor portraits were mainly in the ōkubi-e (large head) format which allowed him to focus on the expression and emotions of the character's face.

He continued to work as an artist in the kabuki theater, but did not design any other actor prints until the early 1950s. From 1951 to 1954, he again collaborated with Watanabe on another series of 30 actor prints. Like the earlier series, these designs were beautifully printed and are very expressive, especially the ōkubi-e portrait.

His 22-year-old daughter died of pneumonia in 1958. He and his wife committed suicide by poison at their daughter's grave two years later.

His works are held in several museums worldwide, including the British Museum, the Portland Art Museum, the Museum of Fine Arts, Boston, the Museum of New Zealand, the Carnegie Museum of Art, the Indianapolis Museum of Art, the Minneapolis Institute of Art, the University of Michigan Museum of Art, the National Museum of Modern Art, Tokyo, the Harvard Art Museums, the Honolulu Museum of Art, the Los Angeles County Museum of Art, the Saint Louis Art Museum, the Toledo Museum of Art, the Art Gallery of New South Wales, the National Gallery of Australia, and the Brooklyn Museum.

Gallery

References

1886 births
1960 suicides
Artists from Yamanashi Prefecture
Shin hanga artists
Suicides by poison in Japan
Ukiyo-e artists
20th-century Japanese painters
20th-century printmakers
1960 deaths
Artists who committed suicide
Japanese printmakers
Japanese portrait artists